The Industrial Technology Research Institute (ITRI) is a technology research and development institution in Taiwan.  

Founded in 1973, ITRI has contributed to moving Taiwan's industries from labor-intensive to innovation-driven. ITRI is headquartered in Hsinchu City, Taiwan, with branch offices in the U.S., Europe, and Japan. ITRI's open lab and incubator have fostered emerging industries and startups including UMC and TSMC.  

In 1982, the new Materials Research Laboratories (MRL) was established under ITRI and Otto C.C. Lin was appointed as its Founding Director. 

Recently, ITRI launched the 2030 Technology Strategy & Roadmap, which focuses on Intelligentization Enabling Technologies in the Smart Living, Quality Health, and Sustainable Environment spaces.

History

Since its founding in 1973 ITRI has been a significant driver of Taiwan's economy, especially its tech industry.

In 2019 ITRI banned all smartphones and computers made by China's Huawei from their internal network for security reasons. China's Taiwan Affairs Office reacted negatively to the decision with their spokesperson saying that the decision “jeopardizes the mainland and Taiwan’s regular economic cooperation for political purposes."

Innovations and applications

Self driving cars
As of 2019 self driving cars designed by ITRI had accumulated more than 2,000 km of testing in the Changhua Coastal Industrial Park.

StarFab
StarFab is a tech accelerator founded by ITRI focusing on innovation in the fields of smart manufacturing, smart medical care, smart finance and smart agriculture. It is headquartered in Taipei with an office in the Tainan Science Park.

R&D Focus
 Smart Living   involves efforts to integrate technologies in information and communication technologies (ICT), cloud services, big data, etc., to develop smart services, logistics, and next-generation handheld devices.
 Quality Health  focuses on the development of innovative therapeutic biologics, composite medical materials and instruments along with healthcare assistance technologies.
 Sustainable Environment  centers on green energy, smart transportation, biomass, advanced green manufacturing, and disaster relief technologies.
Intelligentization Enabling Technology includes AI, semiconductor, communications, cybersecurity, and cloud technologies to support technology breakthrough, and ensure data privacy and information safety.

Executives

Honors
 2023 - Clarivate Top 100 Global Innovator
 2023 - CES Innovation Awards for AI Aquarium
 2022 - R&D 100 Awards for High Resolution Full-Color Micro LED Display for AR Glasses, Point-of-Care AI-DR, and GreenTape™ 9KC LTCC and Ag Metallization for mmWave 5G Wireless Devices
 2022 - Edison Awards for BioMS-Ti and Portable Edge AI-DR
 2022 - Clarivate Top 100 Global Innovator
 2022 - CES Innovation Awards for RGB-D AI Robot, iPetWeaR, and All-in-One Thermal Sensing System
 2021 - Communication Excellence Awards: Best Technology Gold Winner
 2021 - Communication Excellence Awards: Marketing Campaign of the Year Silver Winner
 2021 - Public Relations & Marketing Excellence Awards: External Marketing Campaign of the Year
 2021 - NYX Marcom Awards: Digital Marketing Campaign Grand Winner
 2021 - NYX Marcom Awards: Marketing Material Gold Winner 
 2021 - R&D 100 Awards for Software-defined Augmented Robot Joint (SARJ), 3D Printing Biomimetic Materials and Structures for Tissue Integration (BioMS-Ti), and Ubiquitous Water Wand (UWAW)
 2021 - HR Asia Best Companies to Work for in Asia
 2021 - Edison Awards for AI-Based High Density Shuttle Rack Service System and MetabColor
 2021 - Clarivate Top 100 Global Innovator
 2021 - CES Innovation Awards for iDarlingWeaR
 2020 - R&D 100 Awards for Dye-sensitized cell (DSC) as Energy source of Sensors, Networked Amide Epoxy Polymer Electrolyte for Solid State Lithium-Ion Batteries (NAEPE), and A Smart-Care Solution for Chronic Wound, iSCare
 2020 - Judges' Choice of the SCF Awards
 2020 - Edison Awards for iKNOBEADS and Celluad
 2020 - Derwent Top 100 Global Innovator
 2020 - CES Innovation Awards for PECOLA (Personal Companion Robot for Older People Living Alone) and iStimUweaR
 2019 - R&D 100 Awards for Reconfigurable and Regulatable Battery Array System (RAIBA), Bionic Knobby Magnetic Beads Manufacturing Technology (iKNOBEADS)
 2019 - Derwent Top 100 Global Innovator
 2019 - Edison Awards for iRoadSafe
 2019 - CES Innovation Awards for Hybrid Power Drone with High Payload and Duration
 2018 - R&D 100 Awards for Automatic Police UAV Patrol System, Functional Dyeing Synchronized with CO2 Supercritical Technology, and Portable UVC LED Water Sterilizer System
 2018 - Edison Awards for Fluid-Driven Emergency Rescuer (FDER)
 2018 - CES Innovation Awards for Intelligent Vision System (IVS) for Companion Robots and Handheld Pesticide Residue Detector
 2018 - Clarivate Analytics Top 100 Global Innovator
 2017 - R&D 100 Awards for CoolSo, ChemSEI-Linker, The LCD Waste Recycling System, CINmat, BESTAI, CyperEpi, Power and Thermal-Aware Electronic System Level Platform (PT-ESL), and Prognostic and Health Management Software in Semiconductors (PHM)
 2017 - R&D 100 Special Recognition Award in Green Tech for The LCD Waste Recycling System
 2017 - Edison Awards for Ultrafast Rechargeable Aluminum Battery (URABat)
 2016 - R&D 100 Awards for iSmartweaR, Long-Distance Floating Multi-Screen Head-up Display (HUD) technology, Wearable Walking Assistive Exoskeleton Robot (2WA-EXO), Ultrafast Rechargeable Aluminum Battery (URABat) and SpeedPro
 2016 - ITRI wins Grand Prize and Design Recognition Award at Taiwan OpenStack Hackathon for a wearable sensor device that measures muscle signals of violinists 
 2015 - R&D 100 Awards for Plasmon-Coupled Organic Light-Emitting Diode (PCOLED), Fluid-Driven Emergency Lighting, Higher Sensitivity Tactile-Film System for Wearable Orthosis (HSTS) and PolyE Membrane Technology
 2015 - Frost & Sullivan Best Practices New Product Innovation Award for In-Line Compact Thermal Analyzer (ICTA)
 2015 - Thomson Reuters Top 100 Global Innovators
 2014 - R&D 100 Awards for In-Line Compact Thermal Analyzer (ICTA) and High Efficiency Calcium Looping Technology (HECLOT)
 2013 - R&D 100 Awards for iAT Technology, FluxMerge, and ButyFix
 2012 - The Wall Street Journal's 2012 Technology Innovation Awards for SideLighter and aePLASMA
 2012 - R&D 100 Awards for Lignoxy, TEMM, SideLighter, aePLASMA, Light&Light, and AVA-Clamp
 2012 - Aviation Week's A&D SIC Award for REDDEX
 2011 - The Wall Street Journal's 2011 Technology Innovation Awards for i2R e-Paper and Spray-IT
 2011 - ITRI as Excellent Organization, Solar Industry Awards, UK for Solar Radome
 2011 - R&D 100 Awards for i2R e-Paper and HyTAC
 2011 - Silver Award, The Society for Information Display (SID) Display of the Year Awards (DYA) for ITRI Flexible Substrate for Displays
 2010 - Overall Gold, The Wall Street Journal's 2010 Technology Innovation Awards for FlexUPD, Runner-up for MDPS
 2010 - R&D 100 Awards for FlexUPD, i2/3DW and REDDEX
 2009 - R&D 100 Awards for STOBA
 2009 - The Wall Street Journal's 2009 Technology Innovation Awards for FleXpeaker
 2009 - iF Design Award for Fluid Driven Lighting System
 2009 - Red Dot Design Award for Flexio Radio
 2008 - R&D 100 Awards for On-Chip AC LED

See Honors
for more information.

ITRI Laureates
In order to recognize outstanding individuals for their contributions to technology advancement, industrial development, and betterment of humankind, ITRI inaugurated the honorary ITRI Laureates.

Publication
 ITRI TODAY subscription
 ITRI Annual Report

See also
 Automotive Research & Testing Center
 National Applied Research Laboratories
 Institute for Information Industry
 Taiwan Textile Research Institute
 National Chung-Shan Institute of Science and Technology
 Tsinghua Big Five Alliance

References 

1973 establishments in Taiwan
Multidisciplinary research institutes
Non-profit organizations based in Taiwan
Research institutes established in 1973
Research institutes in Taiwan
Communications and media organizations